During the Renaissance, great advances occurred in geography, astronomy, chemistry, physics, mathematics, manufacturing, anatomy and engineering. The collection of ancient scientific texts began in earnest at the start of the 15th century and continued up to the Fall of Constantinople in 1453, and the invention of printing allowed a faster propagation of new ideas. Nevertheless, some have seen the Renaissance, at least in its initial period, as one of scientific backwardness. Historians like George Sarton and Lynn Thorndike criticized how the Renaissance affected science, arguing that progress was slowed for some amount of time. Humanists favored human-centered subjects like politics and history over study of natural philosophy or applied mathematics. More recently, however, scholars have acknowledged the positive influence of the Renaissance on mathematics and science, pointing to factors like the rediscovery of lost or obscure texts and the increased emphasis on the study of language and the correct reading of texts.

Marie Boas Hall coined the term Scientific Renaissance to designate the early phase of the Scientific Revolution, 1450–1630. More recently, Peter Dear has argued for a two-phase model of early modern science: a Scientific Renaissance of the 15th and 16th centuries, focused on the restoration of the natural knowledge of the ancients; and a Scientific Revolution of the 17th century, when scientists shifted from recovery to innovation.

Context

During and after the Renaissance of the 12th century, Europe experienced an intellectual revitalization, especially with regard to the investigation of the natural world. In the 14th century, however, a series of events that would come to be known as the Crisis of the Late Middle Ages was underway. When the Black Death came, it wiped out so many lives it affected the entire system. It brought a sudden end to the previous period of massive scientific change. The plague killed 25–50% of the people in Europe, especially in the crowded conditions of the towns, where the heart of innovations lay. Recurrences of the plague and other disasters caused a continuing decline of population for a century.

The Renaissance
The 14th century saw the beginning of the cultural movement of the Renaissance. By the early 15th century, an international search for ancient manuscripts was underway and would continue unabated until the Fall of Constantinople in 1453, when many Byzantine scholars had to seek refuge in the West, particularly Italy. Likewise, the invention of the printing press was to have great effect on European society: the facilitated dissemination of the printed word democratized learning and allowed a faster propagation of new ideas.

Initially, there were no new developments in physics or astronomy, and the reverence for classical sources further enshrined the Aristotelian and Ptolemaic views of the universe. Renaissance philosophy lost much of its rigor as the rules of logic and deduction were seen as secondary to intuition and emotion. At the same time, Renaissance humanism stressed that nature came to be viewed as an animate spiritual creation that was not governed by laws or mathematics. Only later, when no more manuscripts could be found, did humanists turn from collecting to editing and translating them, and new scientific work began with the work of such figures as Copernicus, Cardano, and Vesalius.

Important developments

Alchemy 
Alchemy is the study of the transmutation of materials through obscure processes. It is sometimes described as an early form of chemistry. One of the main aims of alchemists was to find a method of creating gold from other substances. A common belief of alchemists was that there is an essential substance from which all other substances formed, and that if you could reduce a substance to this original material, you could then construct it into another substance, like lead to gold. Medieval alchemists worked with two main elements or principles, sulphur and mercury.

Paracelsus was an alchemist and physician of the Renaissance. The Paracelsians added a third principle, salt, to make a trinity of alchemical elements.

Astronomy 

The astronomy of the late Middle Ages was based on the geocentric model described by Claudius Ptolemy in antiquity. Probably very few practicing astronomers or astrologers actually read Ptolemy's Almagest, which had been translated into Latin by Gerard of Cremona in the 12th century. Instead they relied on introductions to the Ptolemaic system such as the De sphaera mundi of Johannes de Sacrobosco and the genre of textbooks known as Theorica planetarum. For the task of predicting planetary motions they turned to the Alfonsine tables, a set of astronomical tables based on the Almagest models but incorporating some later modifications, mainly the trepidation model attributed to Thabit ibn Qurra. Contrary to popular belief, astronomers of the Middle Ages and Renaissance did not resort to "epicycles on epicycles" in order to correct the original Ptolemaic models—until one comes to Copernicus himself.

Sometime around 1450, mathematician Georg Purbach (1423–1461) began a series of lectures on astronomy at the University of Vienna. Regiomontanus (1436–1476), who was then one of his students, collected his notes on the lecture and later published them as Theoricae novae planetarum in the 1470s. This "New Theorica" replaced the older theorica as the textbook of advanced astronomy. Purbach also began to prepare a summary and commentary on the Almagest. He died after completing only six books, however, and Regiomontanus continued the task, consulting a Greek manuscript brought from Constantinople by Cardinal Bessarion. When it was published in 1496, the Epitome of the Almagest made the highest levels of Ptolemaic astronomy widely accessible to many European astronomers for the first time.

The last major event in Renaissance astronomy is the work of Nicolaus Copernicus (1473–1543). He was among the first generation of astronomers to be trained with the Theoricae novae and the Epitome. Shortly before 1514 he began to revive Aristarchus's idea that the Earth revolves around the Sun. He spent the rest of his life attempting a mathematical proof of heliocentrism. When De revolutionibus orbium coelestium was finally published in 1543, Copernicus was on his deathbed. A comparison of his work with the Almagest shows that Copernicus was in many ways a Renaissance scientist rather than a revolutionary, because he followed Ptolemy's methods and even his order of presentation. Not until the works of Johannes Kepler (1571–1630) and Galileo Galilei (1564–1642) was Ptolemy's manner of doing astronomy superseded.

Mathematics 

The accomplishments of Greek mathematicians survived throughout Late Antiquity and the Middle Ages by a long and indirect history. Much of the work of Euclid, Archimedes, and Apollonius, along with later authors such as Hero and Pappus, were copied and studied in both Byzantine culture and in Islamic centers of learning. Translations of these works began already in the 12th century, by the work of translators in Spain and Sicily working mostly from Arabic and Greek sources into Latin. Two of the most prolific were Gerard of Cremona and William of Moerbeke.

The greatest of all translation efforts, however, took place in the 15th and 16th centuries in Italy, as attested by the numerous manuscripts dating from this period currently found in European libraries. Virtually all leading mathematicians of the era were obsessed with the need for restoring the mathematical works of the ancients. Not only did humanists assist mathematicians with the retrieval of Greek manuscripts, they also took an active role in translating these work into Latin, often commissioned by religious leaders such as Nicholas V and Cardinal Bessarion. 

Some of the leading figures in this effort include Regiomontanus, who made a copy of the Latin Archimedes and had a program for printing mathematical works; Commandino (1509–1575), who likewise produced an edition of Archimedes, as well as editions of works by Euclid, Hero, and Pappus; and Maurolyco (1494–1575), who not only translated the work of ancient mathematicians but added much of his own work to these. Their translations ensured that the next generation of mathematicians would be in possession of techniques far in advance of what it was generally available during the Middle Ages.

It must be borne in mind that the mathematical output of the 15th and 16th centuries was not exclusively limited to the works of the ancient Greeks. Some mathematicians, such as Tartaglia and Luca Paccioli, welcomed and expanded on the medieval traditions of both Islamic scholars and people like Jordanus and Fibonnacci.

Medicine 

With the Renaissance came an increase in experimental investigation, principally in the field of dissection and body examination, thus advancing our knowledge of human anatomy. The development of modern neurology began in the 16th century with Andreas Vesalius, who described the anatomy of the brain and other organs; he had little knowledge of the brain's function, thinking that it resided mainly in the ventricles. Understanding of medical sciences and diagnosis improved, but with little direct benefit to health care. Few effective drugs existed, beyond opium and quinine. William Harvey provided a refined and complete description of the circulatory system. The most useful tomes in medicine, used both by students and expert physicians, were materiae medicae and pharmacopoeiae.

Geography and the New World 
In the history of geography, the key classical text was the Geographia of Claudius Ptolemy (2nd century). It was translated into Latin in the 15th century by Jacopo d'Angelo. It was widely read in manuscript and went through many print editions after it was first printed in 1475. Regiomontanus worked on preparing an edition for print prior to his death; his manuscripts were consulted by later mathematicians in Nuremberg.

The information provided by Ptolemy, as well as Pliny the Elder and other classical sources, was soon seen to be in contradiction to the lands explored in the Age of Discovery. The new discoveries revealed shortcomings in classical knowledge; they also opened European imagination to new possibilities. Thomas More's Utopia was inspired partly by the discovery of the New World.

See also
Continuity thesis
The Copernican Question
Renaissance magic
Renaissance technology

Notes

References 

 Dear, Peter. Revolutionizing the Sciences: European Knowledge and Its Ambitions, 1500–1700. Princeton: Princeton University Press, 2001.
 Debus, Allen G. Man and Nature in the Renaissance. Cambridge: Cambridge University Press, 1978.
 Grafton, Anthony, et al. New Worlds, Ancient Texts: The Power of Tradition and the Shock of Discovery. Cambridge: Belknap Press of Harvard University Press, 1992.
 Hall, Marie Boas. The Scientific Renaissance, 1450–1630. New York: Dover Publications, 1962, 1994.

External links
Renaissance science and technology at Britannica.com

Renaissance
Science